Frank Bronstorph (26 April 1898 – 1987) was a Jamaican cricketer. He played in one first-class match for the Jamaican cricket team in 1925/26.

See also
 List of Jamaican representative cricketers

References

External links
 

1898 births
1987 deaths
Jamaican cricketers
Jamaica cricketers
Sportspeople from Kingston, Jamaica